The National Soccer League (NSL) was the top-level soccer league in Australia, run by Soccer Australia and later the Australian Soccer Association. The NSL, the A-League's predecessor, spanned 28 seasons from its inception in 1977 until its demise in 2004, when it was succeeded by the A-League competition run by Football Federation Australia, the successor to the Australian Soccer Association.

During the history of the NSL the league was contested by a total of 42 teams; 41 based in Australia and one based in New Zealand. Seasons initially ran during the winter seasons, until 1989 when this was changed to the summer season. In 1984, the league was split into two conferences (Northern and Southern) to introduce more teams into the competition; the league returned to a single division in 1987. The competition was known by various names through sponsorships; these names included the Philips Soccer League, the Quit National Soccer League, Olympic Airways Soccer League, Coca-Cola Soccer League, the Ericsson Cup and the A-League.

From the league's inaugural season to its demise in 2004, a total of 13 clubs were crowned champions through either a system of first past the post or a finals series that culminated in a grand final. The NSL was Australia's first national sporting league predating the likes of the AFL and NRL.

History

Origin
Competition between club sides from different states existed in various forms prior to the formation of the NSL. The petroleum company Ampol sponsored cup competitions in the various states, starting with New South Wales in 1957, with other states following later. Later a national Ampol Cup was conducted which continued throughout the 1960s. From 1962 until 1968 an Australia Cup was held, but its ambition of becoming an FA Cup style knockout competition went unfulfilled. In the 1970s the top sides from Melbourne and Sydney played off in an end of season series, but the tournament didn't seem to quite capture the legitimacy and popularity that was hoped for.

Plans for a national home and away league went back as far as 1965 for a 1967 start, and were followed up by variations on the theme throughout the 1960s and early 1970s, but faced opposition variously from clubs, who deemed the notion uneconomical, and state federations who feared losing their power. Australia's qualification for the 1974 World Cup led to various discussions in 1975 and 1976, with eventually 14 teams being chosen to participate in the inaugural season of the national league.

The transition from state-based leagues to a national competition was not all smooth. The Victorian Soccer Federation was reluctant for its big clubs to be involved and it appeared the dream of Alex Pongrass of St George and Frank Lowy of Hakoah Sydney for a nationwide club competition would not evolve. Little-known Mooroolbark from Melbourne's outer eastern suburbs broke the deadlock by joining the competition, bringing three other Victorian sides with it, making the national league a reality.

1977–1983: Sydney dominance
The first seven seasons of the league would be dominated by Sydney clubs, with Sydney City winning four titles, and only West Adelaide being able to wrest the title from New South Wales. West secured the 1978 championship after scoring a late equaliser in an Adelaide derby against Adelaide City in the final round of the season. The competition at this stage was a simple first past the post. A post season finals series was played during this era but was considered more of an exhibition series rather than a legitimate game to decide the national champion, although some confusion still exists on this matter particularly amongst some Heidelberg supporters who consider the 1980 'final' as a legitimate decider.

1984–1986: Conference system and power shift
Shrinking crowds led to the radical move of introducing more teams (mainly from Victoria and New South Wales) and splitting the league into two conferences, with the winner of each division to play-off in an end of year two legged final. For season 1984 the 'Australian' Conference had competing teams from New South Wales and the ACT, whilst the 'National' Conference consisted of Victorian, South Australian and Queensland clubs. For 1985 and 1986 this reverted to 'Northern' and 'Southern' Conferences. Strangely, the competition's most geographically northern sides, Brisbane Lions and Brisbane City were in the latter grouping.

This period saw South Melbourne become the first Victorian team to win the league, followed by Brunswick Juventus, and Adelaide City, all Southern conference sides. At the end of the 1986 season, the system was scrapped, and about half the teams were dumped back to their respective state leagues. The criteria used to decide who stayed and who went was based 50% on the 1986 playing record, 40% on past playing record, and 10% on crowd support. The result was that only one team from outside Sydney and Melbourne, reigning champions Adelaide City, was retained.

1987–1989: Return to single division and last years of winter football
The revamped league suffered a major setback early on when Sydney City pulled out of the competition after just one round into the new season. Apart from returning to a single division, the league also dispensed with finals for the 1987 season, reverting to first past the post. Many considered this an ill-considered move, as it robbed the league of its most high-profile games. Finals were re-introduced from 1988, and were to remain until the league's demise. The 1989 season would be the last to be played in winter. This period saw a re-emergence of New South Wales dominance with all titles, minor premierships and runners-up being from that state.

1989–1996: Birth of summer football
Attempts to shift the league towards a summer season went back into the early 1980s, but only came to pass for the 1989/90 season. The rationale for this change was simple. The league would avoid being marginalised in the media during the peak of the Australian Football League and Australian Rugby League seasons, as well as providing better playing surfaces and spectator comfort owing to the better weather.

The impetus given to the league from the switch was not enough for some clubs to remain in the league, with many clubs being relegated or being demoted back to the state leagues, including former champions Brunswick Juventus, St George and APIA Leichhardt, as well as once upon a time contenders in Heidelberg and Preston.

This coincided with a renewed push by soccer authorities to force clubs to market themselves to mainstream Australia, as opposed to their own mostly migrant fan bases. These policies included name and logo changes, as well as the banning of ethnic flags, changes which were begrudgingly agreed to by the clubs, though in the terraces the fans generally continued to chant the old names. Marconi, South Melbourne, Adelaide City and the Melbourne Knights were the dominant sides of this era, with numerous titles and grand final appearances between them.

Stars such as Mark Viduka, Mark Bresciano, Vince Grella, Tony Popovic and Mark Schwarzer debuted in this decade and would later form the core of the Australian Golden generation.

1996–2001: New clubs and attempts to enter the mainstream
From 1996 onwards the league attempted to revitalise the competition and attempt to hook into the mainstream support by finally introducing a team from Western Australia, in the form of Perth Glory, as well as other new entities which promised to deliver mainstream support, as well as being fully professional outfits as opposed to the majority of clubs and players who were only semi-professional. Among the new clubs at this time were the Collingwood Warriors, Carlton, Northern Spirit (GHFA Spirit as of 2004) and Parramatta Power, as well as New Zealand's first professional team, the Football Kingz.

These clubs would have varying degrees of success on and off the field. Collingwood Warriors barely managed to last a season, while Carlton reached the grand final in its debut year, but was unable to attract a substantial fan base. Northern Spirit started off with record crowds, and a good debut season reaching the finals, but gradually crowds declined, and financial difficulties along with a controversial takeover by Rangers, didn't help matters. They would survive until the end of the NSL, but fold thereafter. Parramatta Power failed to gather much support, placed as it was in the midst of the already crowded western Sydney soccer market, and it too would not last beyond the end of the NSL. Perth Glory became the most successful of the new mainstream entrants. High crowds and good performances throughout the NSL's last decade made Perth Glory for many observers the benchmark and role model for all future entrants to the Australian top-flight.

A then record grand final crowd of 40,000 people saw the Brisbane Strikers become the first Queensland side to win the title in season 1996/97, but it never resulted in Brisbane gaining much bigger crowds in the following seasons than they were accustomed to. South Melbourne FC under Ange Postecoglou won back-to-back titles in the late 1990s, and by also winning the 1999 Oceania Club Championship, earning the right to play in the 2000 FIFA Club World Championship, where it put in some respectable performances against sides such as Manchester United and a tidy sum in prize money. Wollongong Wolves became the only side from regional Australia to win the league, with their back-to-back titles in 1999/2000 and 2000/01. The 1999/2000 Grand Final against Perth Glory at Subiaco Oval in Perth saw a record attendance of 43,242, overtaking the 1997 figure in Brisbane and a record that would remain until the 2007 A-League Grand Final in Melbourne. The cancellation of the 2001 FIFA Club World Championship however was a major blow to the league as clubs which had seen a way of making a substantial amount of much needed money.

2001–2004: Decline and demise
After the 2001 FIFA Club World Championship was cancelled, the NSL was in great turmoil. High-profile Australian players began to leave the NSL due to more enticing offers from overseas leagues.

In 1998, Soccer Australia sold the television rights for the NSL and Socceroos matches to the Seven Network in a 10-year contract that was worth $2.5 million a year. Seven bought the rights to be one of the flagships of its pay TV sport channel, C7 Sport.

It also broadcast a small amount of coverage on its free-to-air network. At one point in 2000, the amount of free-to-air coverage on the NSL was only a one-hour highlights package of the NSL after midnight on Wednesdays. Many believe Channel 7 deliberately refused to air games to kill off interest in the league that was flourishing in the 90s.

In 2002, C7 Sport closed after the Seven Network lost the Australian Football League (AFL) rights and pay TV networks stopped carrying the channel. The next year, Seven severed its contract in the last week of Soccer Australia's existence. This left the NSL with no TV coverage at all until SBS picked up the rights soon after.

The consequent lack of sponsorship meant the league fell into even further decline which led to its eventual demise at the end of the 2003–04 season. Highlights were few and far between, but Sydney Olympic re-emerged as a genuine leading club for the first time in a decade, winning its second title, and Perth Glory went on to win the last two titles of the NSL, after previously having lost two grand finals.

The birth of Adelaide United, as a quickly formed replacement of Adelaide City who withdrew just before the start of the final NSL season, was perhaps the sole major highlight of this era, as they put in good performances, but most importantly, registered crowds which had not been seen in Adelaide since the heyday of Adelaide City and West Adelaide.

The league in 2003–04 was won by Perth Glory after a 1-0 win against Parramatta Power on 4 April 2004, almost 27 years to the day that the national competition began. Nik Mrdja had the honour of scoring the last goal in the NSL, a 98th minute golden goal to seal the championship for Perth. After this, national competition went into recess for a year and a half. In November 2004, 8 teams, including 5 from the now defunct NSL, formed the A-League, the revamped national competition whilst many were denied the opportunity due to the bidding process and 1 team for 1 state rule. The first competition began on 26 August 2005, ending the long recess and killing off the NSL and its 24-year history.

Competition format
The competition structure changed many times throughout the NSL's history. From its inception in 1977 until 1983, it was simply a matter of first past the post. However a compromise format was devised between the traditional first past the post and the Australian system of finals. In 1978, 1979 (two-legged Grand Final), 1980 and 1982 a finals series was conducted but the winner of the Grand Final didn't determine who won the title. From 1984 until 1986, the league introduced more teams split into two conferences (1984 – Australian Conference, New South Wales/Australian Capital Territory clubs and National Conference, Victoria, South Australia, Queensland; 1985 and 1986 – Northern Conference, New South Wales/Australian Capital Territory clubs and Southern Conference for the rest) with 12 teams in each. The top five in each division would qualify for the playoffs, with the winner of each of the divisional playoffs playing off in a two-legged Grand Final. In 1987, the league dumped 11 teams, scrapped the split divisions, and the championship system reverted to first past the post.

In 1988 the league re-introduced a finals system, with the top five sides qualifying for the playoffs. In season 1992/93, the league increased the finalists to six. This system was used for the rest of the league's duration, except for season 2002/03 when the top six sides played a further series of home and away games against each other, with the top two playing off in the Grand Final.

The NSL also used a variety of point systems throughout its history. From 1977 until season 1991/92, teams were awarded two points for a win, one point for draw, and none for a loss. The exceptions to this were 1979, in which wins by four goals or more were awarded a bonus point, and 1983, in which three points were awarded for a win. From season 1992/93 onwards three points were awarded for a win, except for season 1994/95. In that season, four points were awarded for a win, with games ending in draws, being decided by penalty shootouts at the end of the game. The winner of the shootout received two points, the loser one point.

Related competitions
Successful NSL clubs gained qualification into the continental competition, the Oceania Club Championship, although the competition only occurred in 1987, 1999 and 2001.  In addition to the main league competition, the NSL also held a knock-out cup competition between 1977 and the 1997 season known as the NSL Cup.  The NSL Cup was initially held during the regular season, before gradually becoming a pre-season warm-up tournament. Between 1984 and 2004 National Youth League ran in conjunction with the NSL as a national youth developmental and reserve league.

Clubs

Source:

Champions

Performance by club

Competition timeline

See also

Johnny Warren Medal
Joe Marston Medal

References

External links
OzFootball NSL section
RSSSF List of Australian Final Tables

 
Defunct soccer leagues in Australia
Recurring sporting events established in 1977
1977 establishments in Australia
Sports leagues established in 1977
2004 disestablishments in Australia
Articles which contain graphical timelines